Landhi Colony  is a neighborhood in the Malir District of Karachi, Pakistan. It was previously a part of Bin Qasim Town, which was disbanded in 2011.

Demography
The ethnic groups in Landhi Colony include Sindhis, Muhajir, Punjabis, Kashmiris, Seraikis, Pakhtuns, Balochs, Brahuis, Memons etc.

References

External links 
 Karachi Website.

Neighbourhoods of Karachi
Bin Qasim Town